is a former Japanese Nippon Professional Baseball catcher. He played for the Toei Flyers from 1961 to 1971 and the Hankyu Braves from 1972 to 1974. He and teammate Masayuki Dobashi split the Japan Series Most Valuable Player Award in 1962.

External links
Career statistics and player information from Baseball-Reference

1938 births
Living people
Rikkyo University alumni
Japanese baseball players
Nippon Professional Baseball catchers
Toei Flyers players
Hankyu Braves players
Japanese baseball coaches
Nippon Professional Baseball coaches